Michkar (also Romanized as Mīchkār; also known as Mīchar) is a village in Kuhestan Rural District, Kelardasht District, Chalus County, Mazandaran Province, Iran. At the 2006 census, its population was 109, in 45 families.

References 

Populated places in Chalus County